Preguiças Lighthouse also called Mandacaru Lighthouse is a lighthouse in Maranhão, Brazil.

White truncated conical concrete tower, four black bands, four ribs, double gallery.

It is situated in the village Mandacaru on the banks of the Preguiças River, within the Lençois National Park. The nearest town is Barreirinhas, head of district. Built in 1940, it is still inhabited and visitable every Tuesday, Thursday and Sunday.

See also
List of lighthouses in Brazil

References

External links

  Centro de Sinalização Náutica Almirante Moraes Rego 

Lighthouses completed in 1940
Lighthouses in Brazil
Buildings and structures in Maranhão
Tourist attractions in Maranhão